William Wagner may refer to:
 William Wagner (land surveyor) (1820–1901), Polish-born Canadian land surveyor
 William Wagner (actor) (1883–1964), American character actor
 William Wagner (philanthropist) (1796–1885), American philanthropist and natural history museum founder in Philadelphia
 William Wagner (physician), German American physician and revolutionary
 Kenny Wagner (William Kenneth Wagner, 1903–1958), Mississippi bootlegger
 William G. Wagner, Williams College faculty member and former interim president
 Bull Wagner (William George Wagner, 1887–1967), pitcher in Major League Baseball
 Wolfe Wagner (William Wolfe Wagner, died 1937), Irish Anglican clergyman
 Bill Wagner (1894–1951), American baseball catcher
 Bill Wagner (software), American software developer
 Bill Wagner III, Arizona politician
 Stanley Wagner (winemaker) (Stanley "Bill" Wagner), early American vintner
 Guillermo Wagner Granizo (Guillermo "Bill" Wagner Granizo),  American ceramic tile artist
 Billy Wagner (William Edward Wagner, born 1971), MLB pitcher